The Men's Artistic Gymnastics competition for the 2014 Pacific Rim Gymnastics Championships was held on 10 April to 12 April 2014 at the Richmond Olympic Oval. The juniors and seniors competed together in the team final and individual all-around, but competed separately during the event finals. The team final and all-around competition were held on 10 April, the junior event finals were held on 11 April, and the senior event finals were held on 12 April.

Team 
Results

Senior

All-Around 
Results

Floor 
Results

Pommel Horse 
Results

Rings 
Results

Vault 
Results

Parallel Bars 
Results

Horizontal Bar 
Results

Junior

All-Around 
Results

Floor 
Results

Pommel Horse 
Results

Rings 
Results

Vault 
Results

Parallel Bars 
Results

Horizontal Bar 
Results

References

Pacific Rim Championships
Pacific Rim Gymnastics Championships